is a Japanese handball player for Toyoda Gosei and the Japanese national team.

He participated at the 2017 World Men's Handball Championship.

References

1991 births
Living people
Japanese male handball players
21st-century Japanese people